Lane 1 of Metrovia (Guasmo - Rio Daule), Opened to the public on July 30 of 2006, it is the first Line of a total of 7 to operate in Metrovia's BRT System.

Stations

South to North

Currently in Service:
Terminal de Integración El Guasmo
Guasmo Sur (1)
Guasmo Norte (2)
Ciudadela La Floresta 2 (3)
Ciudadela La Floresta 1 (4)
Guasmo Central (5)
Barrio Los Tulipanes (6)
Ciudadela La Pradera 2 (7)
Ciudadela La Pradera 1 (8)
Ciudadela 9 de Octubre (9)
Mercado Caraguay (10)
Barrio Cuba (11)
Barrio Centenario (12)
Hospital León Becerra (13)
El Astillero (14)
La Providencia (15)
Biblioteca Municipal (17)
El Correo (18)
Banco Central (19)
Jardines del Malecón (20)
Las Peñas (21)
Ciudadela La Atarazana (22)
Base Naval (23)
Terminal de Integración Río Daule

North to South

Terminal de Integración Río Daule 
Base Naval(20)
Ciudadela La Atarazana (19)
Hospital Luis Vernaza (18)
Boca 9 (17)
La Catedral (16)
Caja Del Seguro (15)
La Providencia (14)
El Astillero (13)
Hospital León Becerra (12)
Barrio Centenario (11)
Barrio Cuba (10)
Caraguay (9)
Ciudadela La Pradera 1 (8)
Ciudadela La Pradera 2 (7)
Barrio Los Tulipanes (6)
Guasmo Central (5)
Ciudadela La Floresta 1 (4)
Ciudadela La Floresta 2 (3)
Guasmo Norte (2)
Guasmo Sur (1)
Terminal de Integración El Guasmo

See also
Metrovia BRT System
Line 2 of Metrovia
Line 3 of Metrovia

References

Metrovia